Now's the Time is an album by saxophonist Billy Mitchell recorded in 1976 for the Catalyst label.

Reception

The Allmusic review by Scott Yanow stated "Billy Mitchell's first album in 13 years is decent, but not all that special. The live set features Mitchell on tenor, soprano and alto performing a pair of lengthy blues and two fairly basic originals. ... Mitchell sounds fine, but nothing that special occurs".

Track listing
All compositions by Billy Mitchell except where noted.
 "My Song" – 9:08
 "T.O. Blues" – 7:03
 "Now's the Time" (Charlie Parker) – 12:33
 "Wonderful" – 17:44

Personnel 
Billy Mitchell – tenor saxophone, soprano saxophone, alto saxophone
Roland Prince – electric guitar
Wes Belcamp – piano
Earl May – bass
Al Beldini (track 3), Ron Turso – drums

References

1976 live albums
Catalyst Records (jazz) live albums
Billy Mitchell (jazz musician) live albums